The Umbrian regional election of 2010 took place on 28–29 March 2010.

The three main candidates were Catiuscia Marini of the Democratic Party, Fiammetta Modena of The People of Freedom and Paola Binetti of the Union of the Centre.

Marini won by a landslide, retaining the region for the centre-left.

Results
Source: Ministry of the Interior – Historical Archive of Elections

2010 elections in Italy
Elections in Umbria